Rocco is both a given name and a surname. 
Origin: Italian. Meaning: Rest, repose. Rocco is a boy's name of Italian origin. It is thought to derive from the Old German word "hrok", which means to rest or repose. The name is associated with a fourteenth-century Catholic saint, San Rocco, who tended to the ill during a plague. Notable people with the name include:

First name
 Rocco Baldelli (born 1981), American Major League Baseball player and manager of the Minnesota Twins
 Rocco Botte (born 1983), American actor and filmmaker
 Rocco Buttiglione (born 1948), Italian politician
 Rocco Chinnici (1925-1983), Italian magistrate killed by the Mafia
 Rocco "Rocky" Colavito (born 1933), American retired Major League Baseball player
 Rocco DiSpirito (born 1966), American celebrity chef and reality show actor
 Rocco Fischetti (1903-1964), American mobster
 Sir Rocco Forte (born 1945), British businessman
 Rocco Granata (born 16 August 1938), Italian-Belgian singer, songwriter, and accordionist
 Rocco Grimaldi (born 8 February 1993), American ice hockey player
 Rocco Hunt (born 1994), Italian rapper
 Rocco Landesman (born 1947), Broadway producer
 Rocco Marchegiano (1923-1969), better known as Rocky Marciano, American heavyweight boxer
 Rocco Mediate (born 1962), American golfer
 Rocco Milde (born 1969), German former footballer
 Rocco Perri (1887-last seen 1944), Canadian bootlegger
 Rocco Petrone (1926-2006), Italian-American engineer and NASA executive
 Rocco Placentino (born 1982), Canadian soccer player
 Rocco Pozzi (1700-1780), Italian painter and engraver
 Rocco Quinn (born 1986), Scottish footballer
 Rocco Rossi (born 1962), Canadian politician
 Rocco Siffredi (born 1964), Italian pornographic film actor
 Rocco Silano (born 1962), American magician and actor

Surname
 Alex Rocco (1936–2015), American actor
 Alfredo Rocco (1875-1935), Italian jurist and Fascist politician, author of the Italian Penal Code
 Carmine Rocco (1912–1982), Vatican diplomat
 Danny Rocco (born 1960), American college football head coach
 David Rocco (born 1970), Canadian actor and producer, host of David Rocco's Dolce Vita
 David Della Rocco (born 1952), actor
 John A. Rocco (1936-2020), American politician
 Keith Rocco, contemporary American military painter
 Lyla Rocco (1933–2015), Italian film actress
 Marc Rocco (1962-2009), American film director, producer and screenwriter
 Mickey Rocco (1916-1997), American Major League Baseball first baseman
 Nereo Rocco (1912-1979), Italian football player and manager
 Pasquale Rocco (born 1970), Italian retired footballer
 Steve Rocco (born 1960), American skateboarder and retired businessman
 Steve Rocco (politician), contemporary American politician

Nickname, stage name or ring name
 Rocko (rapper) (born 1979), American rapper and actor
 Dick "Rocko" Lewis (1908–1966), American entertainer
 Rocco Hunt (born 1994), Italian rapper
 Rocco Prestia (1951–2020), bass player for the band Tower of Power
 Rocco Mandroid, member of the New Zealand punk band the Futurians
 Rocko Schamoni (born 1966), German entertainer, author and musician
 Rocco Rock (1953-2002), American professional wrestler
 Mark Rocco (born 1951), English retired professional wrestler
 Rocco Nacino (born 1987), Filipino actor

Fictional characters
 Johnny Rocco, fugitive gangster in the 1948 film Key Largo, played by Edward G. Robinson
 Rocco Fuentes Echaguei, a fictional character in the 2002–2003 Argentine teenage telenovella Rebelde Way
 Rocco Parondi, in the 1960 Italian film Rocco and His Brothers
 Rocco the Beaver, a puppet on the Danish TV series Dolph & Wulff med Venner (Dolph & Wulff with Friends)
 Rocco the Dog, a puppet on the Canadian TV series Puppets Who Kill
 Rocco de' Medici, a master swordsman and long-lost heir to the late Duke of Florence in the TV series Leonardo.
 Rocco Barbella, one of Sergeant Bilko′s corporals in The Phil Silvers Show
 Rocco Lampone, a fictional character in Mario Puzo's novel The Godfather and Francis Ford Coppola's The Godfather.
 Rocco, the puppy saved by Tom Hardy’s character in The Drop
 Rocko, from Rocko's Modern Life, a 1990s Nickelodeon animated series
 Rocko, from the cartoon series Undergrads
Rocky Balboa, from the Rocky film series starring Sylvester Stallone as the films’ title character, who is sometimes called Rocco.
 Rocko, a penguin from the 1995 animated film The Pebble and the Penguin.
 Rocco, Zoe's pet rock and Elmo's nemesis on Sesame Street.

Other
 The West Maple Omaha Rock, a boulder in Omaha, Nebraska, nicknamed Rocko

See also
 Roco

Italian-language surnames
Italian masculine given names
German masculine given names